The red-chested swallow (Hirundo lucida) is a small non-migratory passerine bird found in West Africa, the Congo Basin and Ethiopia. It has a long, deeply forked tail and curved, pointed wings.

It was formerly considered a subspecies of the closely resembling barn swallow. However, the adult red-chested swallow differs in being slightly smaller than its migratory relative, in addition to having a narrower blue breast band and shorter tail streamers. Juveniles are more comparable to barn swallow chicks.

References

red-chested swallow
Birds of West Africa
Birds of Central Africa
Birds of the Horn of Africa
red-chested swallow